Slides or sliders are a type of light footwear that are characterized by having a loose heel that holds on to the foot from the front. Like flip-flops, they are typically employed in casual situations, in addition to being a unisex footgear worn by both sexes. Sliders are distinguished from flip-flops by their vamp strap which does not separate the big toe from the rest of the toes.

Description
Slides can be high-heeled, flat-heeled or somewhere in between, and may cover nearly the entire foot from ankle to toe, or may have only one or two narrow straps. They usually include a single strap or a sequence of straps across the toes and the lower half of the foot to hold the shoe on the foot. The term is descriptive in that this shoe is easy to 'slide' on and off the foot when the wearer wants to do so. Slides do not have a “Y” shaped strap, like the flip-flop. They generally consist of a sole and a simple upper strap, the latter having the purpose of keeping them attached to the foot. Their uppers can be smooth and continuous or have fasteners, such as buckles or Velcro. Unlike slippers and mules, which are closed at the front, slide shoes are never closed at the front, they leave the toes visible and in the open air. 

They can be made with any type of material, from leather to fabric, through natural fibers to synthetic materials. They are mainly used at the beach or at the swimming pool. Slides are still designed to be light and comfortable, and to make the foot breathe easier when it's hot, just like flip flops.

Health
Slippers can cause damage to the feet if they are made of sponges or materials on which sufficient checks have not been carried out, particularly if the wearer is allergic to certain types of fabrics. Some studies show that frequent use seems to be the cause of a wide range of injuries and illnesses, such as cracks or fissures in the heels, plantar fasciitis, muscle inflammation or low back pain. This happens because most people tend to tighten their toes to maintain better support and the pressure of the toes adds stress to the ankle area and the entire foot in general.

History 
Slides can be traced back to Ancient Rome. Though they are often thought to come from as far back as Ancient Egypt or Ancient Greece, but there is a lack of documentation to further prove that. The popularity of slides in the United States started in the late 1960s, when vibrant, colorful aesthetics, such as cheery flower motifs, were followed. Across the world in Germany the brand Birkenstock created the first fitness slide, a simple design made from contoured cork with a single buckled leather strap. Another German company, Adidas invented the well-known Adilette pool slide.

Use
In Latino, South Asian, and West Asian cultures, flip flops and slides are commonly used as corporal punishment by parents for disobedience or bad behavior, especially when there is recurrence (see also slippering). Techniques include the parent throwing the slide at their children as a missile or projectile modality.

Flip-flops are also widely used as a flyswatter because they are objects that are hard enough, flat and close at hand to be worn on the feet, and because of their flexibility they allow for striking blows to quickly kill insects without losing sight of them.

Fashion 
High fashion designers such as Prada, Nike, Gucci, Burberry, Walk London and Marc Jacobs have included them in their collection.  The different designs and ideas that come from the designers are expansive. Crafting slides from premium grade leathers and suedes, feathers to using floral patterns, faux fur lining and regal pearls being attached or used as the main design behind slides. Nike Benassi JDI is a popular slide shoe for men and women.

Gallery

See also
 Hnyat-phanat (Burmese)
 Sandal
 Slipper
 Flip-flops

References

Sandals
1960s fashion
2000s fashion
2010s fashion
2020s fashion
Australian fashion
Australian clothing
Shoes